Ray Weymann is a retired astronomer and astrophysicist, associated with the Carnegie Institution of Washington.  His PhD is from Princeton University.  He is a founder of the Climate Science Rapid Response Team, a member National Academy of Sciences (1984), and past president of the Astronomical Society of the Pacific 1973-1975.

He has made notable contributions to astronomy in the areas of the evolution of high redshift galaxies, and mass ejection from active galaxies.

References

American astronomers
21st-century American physicists
Princeton University alumni
Year of birth missing (living people)
Members of the United States National Academy of Sciences
Living people